The AIDC XC-2 was a prototype civil transport aircraft first flown in 1978 in Taiwan (Republic of China). It was a high-wing monoplane powered by two turboprop engines. The main undercarriage was carried in sponsons on either side of the boxy fuselage, maximising internal space.

A single prototype was built and was not selected for production. A scale model of the XC-2 is found at Hualien Air Force Base.

Specifications (performance estimated)

See also

References

Further reading

External links

 luftfahrt-archiv.de (archived)

XC-2
1970s Taiwanese airliners
High-wing aircraft
Abandoned civil aircraft projects
Aircraft first flown in 1978
Twin-turboprop tractor aircraft